"Filli Vanilli" is the fourteenth episode of the fourth season of animated television series My Little Pony: Friendship Is Magic, as well as the seventy-ninth overall. Written by Amy Keating Rogers, directed by Jayson Thiessen, and co-directed by Jim Miller, the episode centers around Fluttershy secretly standing-in for Big McIntosh in a few concerts. Big Mac lip-syncs on stage to hide it, but they are caught when Fluttershy accidentally knocks the curtain down. Aired on February 15, 2014, on The Hub, the episode was viewed by 584,000 people and received praise from critics for its writing and overall message.

Plot 
Fluttershy sings her animals a beautiful song in the morning. Hearing this, her friends suggest that she should perform with the Pony Tones vocal quartet at a benefit concert. She refuses this due to her stage fright, even though she is a big fan of the Pony Tones. The next morning, the group comes together for a rehearsal. However, Big McIntosh, a member of the group who is supposed to sing bass at the concert, lost his voice during a turkey call competition. Now, with a member less, the group has to find a replacement for him.

Fluttershy decides to consult shaman and herbalist Zecora. Zecora says that she can cure Big Mac, but not in time for the concert. However, she reminds Fluttershy of her Poison Joke effect that deepened Fluttershy's voice, turning it into masculine "Flutterguy", and says that she can recreate it. Fluttershy is still nervous about singing on-stage, but Rarity suggests a solution: Fluttershy sings backstage, and Big Mac lip-syncs to her performance.

The concert goes perfectly, and requests for more performances keep pouring in. Fluttershy insists on continuing to sing for Big Mac out of sight as she enjoys being able to sing. After Big Mac recovers his voice, Rarity informs her that she is no longer required to sing. Seeing her disappointment, they allow her to perform one last time. During the song, Fluttershy accidentally knocks the curtain down, which reveals her. Even though the audience cheers for her, Fluttershy runs off in embarrassment.

Her friends find her at her cottage and convince her that facing her worst fear was not as bad as she had imagined because the audience loved her performance. Fluttershy agrees to perform privately for her friends with the Pony Tones and agrees to permanently join the band once she fully overcomes her stage fright.

Production 

Amy Keating Rogers, the episode's writer, said that she pitched the idea for the episode back in September 2012. She added that initial name of the episode was "The Return of Flutterguy", which was changed to "Flutterfear" because the previous title gave "too much information." The title was later changed to "Filli Vanilli", a reference to the German-French R&B duo Milli Vanilli, who were caught in a scandal that exposed them lip-syncing their performances.

Featured songs 
Both songs featured in the episode were composed by the series songwriter, Daniel Ingram. The orchestration of "Music in the Treetops" was done by Trevor Hoffman. "Find the Music in You" was orchestrated and arranged by Hoffman and Caleb Chan.

 Music in the Treetops
 Find the Music in You

Broadcast and reception 
On February 14, 2014, a day before the episode aired, Entertainment Weekly released a preview of the episode showing Fluttershy singing. The episode aired on The Hub on February 15, 2014. According to the Nielsen household ratings, the episode was watched by approximately 0.3 percent of American households and had 584,000 viewers.

Daniel Alvarez of Unleash the Fanboy gave the episode 4.5 out of 5 stars. He praised the writing and said that "the message of stage fright/fear in general was greatly handled." Alvarez further added that the episode "should and probably will go down as a classic", however he said that Pinkie Pie was annoying in the episode according to him. Andrea Libman, who voiced Pinkie Pie and Fluttershy, won the 2014 UBCP/ACTRA Award in the "Best Voice" category for her work in this episode.

Home media 
The episode is part of the complete Region 1 Season 4 DVD Set by Shout! Factory, which was made available in stores on December 2, 2014. Under the title "Flutterfear", it was also a part of the "My Little Pony: Maud Pie" DVD, released on January 8, 2018.

References

External links 
 

My Little Pony: Friendship Is Magic episodes
2014 American television episodes
2014 Canadian television episodes